The Clock Open was a golf tournament on the LPGA Tour from 1955 to 1956. It was played at the Clock Country Club in Whittier, California.

Winners
1956 Marlene Hagge
1955 Patty Berg

References

Former LPGA Tour events
Golf in California
Sports competitions in Los Angeles County, California
Women's sports in California
Whittier, California
Recurring sporting events established in 1955
Recurring sporting events disestablished in 1956
1955 establishments in California
1956 disestablishments in California